is an American-born Japanese actress. She started her career in the entertainment industry at the age of nine. She is best known for her role in the TV adaptation of Bloody Monday, Kyōfu, and for appearing in TVXQ's "Dōshite Kimi o Suki ni Natte Shimattandarō?" music video.

Career
Fujii made her film debut in 2006, when she played as Miki Onaka in Simsons. In 2008, Fujii played the leading character of Toru Ikegami in Ame No Tsubasa. In the same year, she starred as Aoi Asada in the live-action television drama adaptation of Bloody Monday.

In 2012, Fujii played a cameo of Mina in Panda and Hedgehog and Akiko in The King of Dramas.

In 2013, Fujii starred in the MBC reality show We Got Married Global alongside Lee Hongki. In 2014, Fujii played the character of Oshikiri in Monsterz, the Japanese remake of the Korean film Haunters, and Mika Aota in the tokusatsu comedy film Joshi Zu.

Personal life
Fujii graduated from faculty of letters Keio University where she got Bachelor of Arts in human relations.  Fujii writes a film critic column for Barfout. Fujii is fluent in Korean and English, in addition to her native Japanese.

Filmography

Television dramas

Film

Stage

Variety

Music videos

Awards and nominations

References

External links

 Agency profile 
 Agency profile 
 Official blog 
 
 

1988 births
Living people
Actresses from San Diego
Japanese expatriates in South Korea
Japanese film actresses
Japanese stage actresses
Japanese television actresses
Keio University alumni
People from Chiba (city)
People from Niigata (city)
20th-century Japanese actresses
21st-century Japanese actresses
21st-century American women